Marzouk Al-Otaibi (born 7 November 1975) is a Saudi Arabian former footballer, who last played as a center forward for Al-Markhiya in Qatar.

Club career
Al-Otaibi started his career at Al-Shabab Club. In 1999, he joined Al-Ittihad for a then-record 9 million Saudi riyals in which he spent around 8 years with Al-Ittihad. While with Al-Ittihad, Al-Otaibi won several national and international titles. Al-Otaibi joined Al-Nassr in the summer of 2007.

Al-Otaibi joined Qatari 2nd Division club Al-Markhiya on 26 December 2011 on a six-month deal.

International career
Otaibi made several appearances for the senior Saudi Arabia national football team, including the 1999 FIFA Confederations Cup and the 2000 AFC Asian Cup finals and the 2002 and 2004 AFC Asian Cup and 2006 FIFA World Cup qualifying rounds.

1999 FIFA Confederations Cup

He shined in the 1999 FIFA Confederations Cup in Mexico where he finished as joint top scorer along with Ronaldinho and Cuauhtémoc Blanco with 6 goals each. He scored a super hat-trick (4 goals) against 8-man Egypt and added another two against Brazil in the semi-finals.

International goals
Scores and results list Saudi Arabia's goal tally first.

References

External links
 

1975 births
Living people
Saudi Arabian footballers
Saudi Arabian expatriate footballers
Saudi Arabia international footballers
1999 FIFA Confederations Cup players
2000 AFC Asian Cup players
2004 AFC Asian Cup players
Al-Shabab FC (Riyadh) players
Ittihad FC players
Riffa SC players
Al Nassr FC players
Al-Jabalain FC players
Al-Wehda Club (Mecca) players
Expatriate footballers in Bahrain
Expatriate footballers in Qatar
Al-Najma SC players
Al-Watani Club players
Jeddah Club players
Al-Markhiya SC players
Qatari Second Division players
Saudi First Division League players
Saudi Second Division players
Saudi Professional League players
Saudi Arabian expatriate sportspeople in Bahrain
Saudi Arabian expatriate sportspeople in Qatar
Association football forwards